Gianni Stecchi (born 3 March 1958) is a retired Italian pole vaulter.

Biography
He won one medal at the International athletics competitions. He is the father of Claudio Stecchi.

Achievements

National titles
He has won 3 times the individual national championship.
2 wins in pole vault (1986, 1987)
1 win in pole vault indoor (1987)

See also
 Italian all-time top lists - Pole vault

References

External links
 

1958 births
Living people
Sportspeople from Florence
Italian male pole vaulters
World Athletics Championships athletes for Italy
Mediterranean Games gold medalists for Italy
Athletes (track and field) at the 1987 Mediterranean Games
Mediterranean Games medalists in athletics